Trithemis apicalis is a species of dragonfly in the family Libellulidae. It is native to the Democratic Republic of the Congo, and at least one specimen has been collected in Cameroon. It may occur in other nations, including Nigeria. The taxonomy of the species is not entirely clear, and it has been placed in several genera.

References

apicalis
Insects of the Democratic Republic of the Congo
Insects of Cameroon
Insects described in 1954
Taxonomy articles created by Polbot